Admiral Sir Phipps Hornby,  (27 April 1785 – 19 March 1867) was a prominent and experienced Royal Navy officer of the nineteenth century. Hornby served on frigates throughout most of his wartime experience, which included witnessing the Nore Mutiny first hand aged 12 in 1797. Later, commanding his own sixth-rate  in 1811, Hornby played a vital role in the British victory at the Battle of Lissa. At Lissa a British squadron under William Hoste overwhelmed a French force more than twice their own strength, Volage combating a much larger ship alone for several minutes and taking numerous casualties, including Hornby, who was wounded.

Later in life, Hornby accepted a succession of home and seagoing positions to ensure the promotion prospects for his son in the navy as well as to support his close allies in Parliament under the Earl of Derby, to whom he was related. These positions included a period in command of the Pacific Fleet and later a role as one of the Lords of the Admiralty. During his career, Hornby accrued numerous awards and accolades, being made a Knight Grand Cross of the Order of the Bath and a full admiral before his death in 1867.

Origins
Hornby was born in 1785, the 5th son of Rev. Geoffrey Hornby (1750–1812), of Scale Hall, near Lancaster in Lancashire, Rector of Winwick, High Sheriff of Lancashire in 1774 and a Deputy Lieutenant of Lancashire, Colonel of a regiment of Lancashire militia, by his wife Lucy Smith-Stanley (d.1833) a daughter of James Smith-Stanley, Lord Strange (1716–1771), (son and heir apparent of Edward Stanley, 11th Earl of Derby (1689–1776) of Knowsley Hall in Lancashire) and a sister of Edward Smith-Stanley, 12th Earl of Derby (1752–1834). Phipps Hornby's sister Charlotte Margaret Hornby (d.1817) married their first cousin Edward Smith-Stanley, 13th Earl of Derby (1775–1851), KG, and was the mother of Edward Smith-Stanley, 14th Earl of Derby (1799–1869), thrice Prime Minister of the United Kingdom (1852, 1858–9, 1866–8), thus Phipps Hornby's nephew. His eldest brother was Edmund Hornby (1773–1857) of Dalton Hall near Burton, Westmorland, a Member of Parliament for Preston, Lancashire, from 1812 to 1826, who married his first cousin Lady Charlotte Stanley (d.1805), a daughter of Edward Smith-Stanley, 12th Earl of Derby. The close association between the Earls of Derby and the Hornby family would play a significant role in Phipps Hornby's career and politics.

Career
Hornby received education at Sunbury-on-Thames and joined the Navy as a midshipman in 1797 aged 12.

In 1797, Britain was embroiled in the French Revolutionary Wars, and Hornby's ship  became caught up in the Nore Mutiny just weeks after he joined her.

Napoleonic Wars
Excellent was detached from Nelson's fleet soon afterwards and in 1805 and 1806 participated in numerous operations on the Italian coast, particularly at Gaeta. Excellent was also present at the capture of Capri. Hornby was granted his first independent command in 1806, the small armed vessel HMS Duchess of Bedfordshire and in her fought off two large Spanish privateers. In 1807 he was promoted to commander and took over the sloop  in which he fought numerous engagements with Spanish gunboats off Cadiz.

In 1809, Minorca operated briefly with the squadron in the Adriatic Sea and the following year Hornby was promoted to post captain, becoming temporary commander of  before moving to the small sixth rate  to serve in the Adriatic squadron under William Hoste. Hornby was wounded in March 1811 during the Battle of Lissa, at which his ship fought a much larger French vessel and despite losing all but one gun, remained in combat throughout. While commander of Spartan, Hornby participated in the capture of Elba from the French, for which he was invested with the Austrian order of St Joseph of Würzburg.

Later service
In 1814, Hornby married Sophia Maria Burgoyne, daughter of General John Burgoyne. The couple had five daughters and three sons. The eldest son, John, died in service with the Royal Engineers in 1848 aged 27, while his younger sons Geoffrey Hornby and James John Hornby had lengthy and successful careers in the Royal Navy and education respectively. Hornby was appointed a Companion of the Order of the Bath on 4 June 1815 and the following year paid off Spartan and entered semi-retirement. During his retirement, Hornby dabbled in politics, a supporter of the Earls of Derby.

In 1832, Hornby returned to service to promote his son's career through preferment, initially becoming superintendent of Plymouth Naval Hospital and in 1838 moving to become superintendent of the Woolwich Dockyard. In 1841 he became comptroller-general of the Coast Guard until 1846 when he was promoted to rear admiral. In 1852 Hornby returned to Europe to serve as a Second Naval Lord under the Duke of Northumberland and remained in post until his final retirement in 1853, shortly after the fall of Lord Derby's government.

In retirement Hornby continued to receive honours, eventually being promoted full admiral in 1858 and becoming a Knight Grand Cross of the Order of the Bath in 1861. He died a widower at his estate in the village of Little Green near Petersfield in Hampshire in March 1867.

See also

Notes

|-

|-

1785 births
1867 deaths
Royal Navy admirals
Lords of the Admiralty
Knights Grand Cross of the Order of the Bath
Royal Navy personnel of the French Revolutionary Wars
Royal Navy personnel of the Napoleonic Wars